(Weeping, lamenting, worrying, fearing), 12, is a church cantata by Johann Sebastian Bach.

Bach was appointed  in Weimar in the spring of 1714, a position that called for the performance of a church cantata each month. He composed Weinen, Klagen, Sorgen, Zagen as the second cantata in the series, on a text probably written by court poet Salomon Franck. The work is structured in seven movements, an instrumental Sinfonia, a choral passacaglia, a recitative on a Bible quotation, three arias and, as the closing chorale, the last stanza from Samuel Rodigast's hymn "" (1674). The cantata is scored for three vocal soloists, a four-part choir, trumpet, oboe, bassoon, two violins, two violas, and basso continuo.

Bach performed the cantata again in his first year as Thomaskantor – director of church music – in Leipzig, on 30 April 1724. He reworked the first section of the first chorus to form the Crucifixus movement of the Credo in his Mass in B minor. Franz Liszt based extended keyboard compositions on the same material.

History and words 

On 2 March 1714 Bach was appointed concertmaster of the Weimar court capelle of the co-reigning dukes Wilhelm Ernst and Ernst August of Saxe-Weimar. The prescribed readings for that Sunday were from the First Epistle of Peter, "Submit yourselves to every ordinance of man", and from the Gospel of John, Jesus announcing his second coming in the so-called Farewell Discourse, saying "your sorrow shall be turned into joy". The text, depicting the affliction that Christians have to pass, is assumed to have been written by Salomon Franck, the Weimar court poet who wrote most texts for Bach cantatas of the Weimar period. It follows details of the Gospel and the idea from the epistle reading: "For this is thankworthy, if a man for conscience toward God endure grief, suffering wrongfully." (verse 19). Franck contends that this is true not only for the disciples who were addressed directly, but for every Christian. Movement 4 sees the suffering of Jesus as a consolation for the afflicted Christian, movement 5 voices a decision to follow Jesus even in suffering, movement 6 offers the consolation that it will be only a short time until all sadness is overcome, alluding to (as in movement 4) . The cantata is closed by the sixth and final stanza of the hymn "" (1674) by Samuel Rodigast. The theme of the first part of the text is a situation of God's temporary absence.

In Leipzig, Jubilate was the beginning of the trade fair  (Easter fair) which attracted visitors for three weeks. His predecessor, Johan Kuhnau, had already noted that "visitors and distinguished gentlemen certainly want to hear something fine in the principal churches."

Franz Liszt based two keyboard works on the first section of movement 2, Prelude after a 'theme from Weinen, Klagen, Sorgen, Zagen' by J. S. Bach   (S. 179, 1854) [for organ or piano] and Variations on a theme from 'Weinen, Klagen, Sorgen, Zagen' by J. S. Bach (S. 180, 1862) [for piano].

Scoring and structure 

The cantata in seven movements is scored for three vocal soloists (alto (A), tenor (T) and bass (B)), a four-part choir SATB, trumpet (Tr), oboe (Ob), bassoon (Fg), two violins (Vl), two violas (Va) and basso continuo (Bc).

In the following table of the movements, the scoring follows the Neue Bach-Ausgabe. The keys and time signatures are taken from Alfred Dürr, using the symbol for common time (4/4).

Music 

The autograph score is titled "". John Eliot Gardiner notes that the keys of the arias and the closing chorale move upwards like a ladder, ascending by thirds.

1 

The cantata is opened by a Sinfonia, marked adagio assai, which resembles the slow movement of an oboe concerto, with an expressive and plaintive solo.

2 

The first choral movement, "" (Weeping, lamentation, worry, despair), is in  form. The lamento, a chromatic fourth ostinato, is repeated twelve times. Musicologist Julian Mincham notes that Henry Purcell arrived at a similar motif in Dido's Lament in the opera Dido and Aeneas, which Bach probably did not know. The first four words are each sung by a different vocal part, each overlapping the next. Beginning with the highest voice, each part sings an extended sigh. The setting is intensified, until in the seventh repeat all voices continue the text simultaneously: "" ("dread and need" or "anguish and trouble"). The ninth repeat is similar to the first, but in more extreme harmonies. The twelfth repeat is instrumental. The middle section of the line about the Christians "" (that bear the marks of Jesus), first marked "un poco allegro", is in a contrasting mood. Its last section is marked andante, the voices enter one after the other, beginning with the lowest and rising. Throughout the middle section, the instruments play colla parte with the voices. John Eliot Gardiner describes the first section as a "tombeau, one of the most impressive and deeply affecting cantata movements Bach can have composed to that point".

3 

In German, sorrow is mentioned first, then the final Kingdom of God. Bach repeats the beginning text four times, while the singular destination appears only once. The key word "Trübsal" is illustrated each time by a downward line, each time with more intensity. In the end, an ascending scale in the first violin illustrates the idea of entering the kingdom of God. The scale is in C major, while the movement is in C minor, a symbol of the Kingdom of God which is a seen but not yet present. The scale is related to the beginning of the tune of the closing chorale.

4 

The first of three arias, "" (Cross and crown are bound together), reflects the conflicting motifs of "Kreuz und Krone" (cross and crown) and "Kampf und Kleinod" (conflict and jewel). The aria for alto voice and an oboe which is almost always present, is in  form, ABA. A ritornello frames part A, but also accompanies the vocal entry. It is thus heard six times in different context, related to the repetitions of the passacaglia of movement 2. The music illustrates the union of the four contrasting elements (all beginning with K):  is sung as a melisma with a trill in measure 15, the preciousness of the jewel appears as a trill in the voice or the accompaniment. The text is also repeated in the middle section, as Bach was still experimenting with the  form.

5 

In the second aria, "" (I follow after Christ), the decision to follow Jesus is made. "Walking steps" in imitation symbolize the following. The first motif is an upward scale, illustrating the direction of Heaven, played by the first violin, imitated in fast succession by the second violin and then the continuo. The voice enters with the same motif. Towards the end, the steps are expanded to more than an octave, reaching Heaven. The bass singer and the continuo are in unison, interpreted as a mystical union of man and God.

6 

The form of the aria follows the bar form of the chorale instead of the usual  form.

7 

The closing chorale, "" (What God does, is well done), is set for four parts, illuminated by an instrumental obbligato part. Masaaki Suzuki and Gardiner use the trumpet that played the cantus firmus in the preceding aria.

Recordings 

The table entries are excerpted from the list of recordings from the selection on the Bach-Cantatas website. Orchestras playing period instruments in historically informed performance, and vocal ensembles with one voice per part are marked by green background.

References

Sources 
 
 Weinen, Klagen, Sorgen, Zagen BWV 12; BC A 68 / Sacred cantata (4th Sunday of Easter) Bach Digital
 BWV 12 Weinen, Klagen, Sorgen, Zagen: English translation, University of Vermont
 Text-, Liedvorlagen, Bibelkonkordanzen und Besetzungsangaben / zu den geistlichen Kantaten Johann Sebastian Bachs / BWV 12 s-line.de 
 Cantata BWV 12 jsbchorales.net
 Günther Zedler: Die erhaltenen Kirchenkantaten Johann Sebastian Bachs 
 Christian Wolff: Kantate "Weinen, Klagen, Sorgen, Zagen" BWV 12 Thomaskirche 2013 
 Luke Dahn: BWV 12.7 bach-chorales.com

Church cantatas by Johann Sebastian Bach
1714 compositions